Larry Campbell is a Canadian Senator.

Larry Campbell may also refer to:

 Larry Campbell (musician) (born 1955), American multi-instrumentalist
 Larry Campbell (Oregon politician) (born 1931), Republican politician from Oregon
 Larry Campbell (Kansas politician) (born 1955), member of the Kansas House of Representatives
 Larry Joe Campbell (born 1970), American actor and comedian
 Laurence Campbell, British comic artist
 Laurence Campbell (sculptor), 1911–1946, was an Irish sculptor